Tailgating is the action of a driver driving behind another vehicle while not leaving sufficient distance to stop without causing a collision if the vehicle in front stops suddenly.

The safe distance for following another vehicle varies depending on various factors including vehicle speed, weather, visibility and other road conditions. Some jurisdictions may require a minimal gap of a specified distance or time interval. When following heavy vehicles or in less than ideal conditions (e.g. low light or rain), a longer distance is recommended.

Causes
There can be several reasons for tailgating.

Preventing cut ins
Tailgating can occur when a vehicle attempts to prevent another vehicle on the right or left from cutting in front of them. The tailgating (or preventing) vehicle will drive as close as possible to another leading vehicle to prevent the side vehicle from cutting in. Like all forms, this practice of tailgating is illegal and attempts to force the side vehicle to slow down and get into the line of traffic behind the tailgating vehicle. This practice is very likely to evoke road rage where one vehicle is blocking and another attempts to defy the block.

Negligence
Tailgating can occur because of a lack of perceived risk in so doing. Thus, it is done unconsciously or negligently, very often by people who consider themselves safe drivers and generally obey some other rules of the road. Evidence shows that more experienced drivers are more likely to be involved in rear-end collisions, possibly because they overestimate their skill and become complacent about allowing sufficient distance to avoid an accident.

Coercion
In its most uncivil form, it can be a case of road rage or intimidation. An example would be where the tailgating driver (the driver in the following vehicle) threatens damage to the leading vehicle and its occupants by driving aggressivelyperhaps also with use of headlights and hornto coerce the leading vehicle's driver into getting out of the way. The driver being tailgated might not wish to comply, especially if doing so would involve breaking the law, such as by increasing speed beyond the speed limit or changing lanes without due regard for safety.

Aerodynamics
A form of deliberate tailgating known as slipstreaming, "draft-assisted forced stop", or "draft-assisted forced auto stop" (D-FAS) is a technique used by some hypermilers to achieve greater fuel economy. D-FAS involves turning off the engine and gliding in neutral while tailgating a larger vehicle in order to take advantage of the reduced wind resistance in its immediate wake. Note that this practice is extremely dangerous: while tailgating itself is inherently risky, the danger of collision is increased with D-FAS as power for power brakes can be lost after a few applications of the brake pedal and, with older cars, the pressure that causes power steering to function can be lost as well.

Trailing and columns
Another instance whereby the practice of driving on a road very close to a frontward vehicle or at a close distance may occur is during an occasion whereby the drivers of the two cars are acquainted to one another. This may be due to it being a procession of motor vehicles, typically carrying or escorting a prominent person that wants to avoid interlopers. Another instance may occur where the leading vehicle is showing directions to the trailing vehicle and the trailing vehicle attempts to avoid allowing an interloping vehicle to come in between them. Another sphere wherein tailgating has been observed is among drivers who are in a hurry, or other public road activity whose prerequisite is urgency or agitation.

Hazards of tailgating
Tailgating can be dangerous to the tailgater, especially if they are driving closely behind a large vehicle (such as a tractor-trailer, or gas tanker). By tailgating, the driver has a shorter distance to stop, decreases the margin of error and blocks the awareness of surroundings.

If the leading vehicle decelerates suddenly (such as when encountering a traffic jam, traffic lights, avoiding pedestrians, etc.), the tailgater has a high risk of causing a rear-end collision, for which in insurance terms, they would always be held responsible.  In many jurisdictions, a two second gap is recommended between any two successive moving vehicles, characterised in Britain by the slogan, "only a fool breaks the two second rule".

Prevention
 
Tailgating causes most rear-end crashes in South Australia. Some motorways in the United Kingdom and Australia feature certain road markings which can help resolve this problem. Consisting of an arrangement of chevrons, these remind the driver not to tailgate, and assist in the two second rule. There is also signage in Britain on smart motorways when they are very congested, to say "stay in lane: congestion".  This is to remind motorists that there is, in these conditions, no longer an overtaking lane, merely a number of lanes, some moving faster than others at different points in time (undertaking by inner lanes being entirely permissible in this circumstance). Those in the outermost lanes should maintain a two second gap to the vehicle in front; as long as they do this, it is officially discouraged to change lanes. Public goods vehicle licence training in Britain states that lorries should increase the 2 second gap to the vehicle in front to 3 seconds when being tailgated to ensure that emergency braking can be a little gentler, to compensate for the tailgating vehicle behind having eaten up its own reaction time to almost nothing.

In Germany, tailgating is punishable with a fine of up to €400. In case of gross negligence, one or more penalty points are given and the driver's license may additionally be immediately suspended for up to 3 months.

References

External links
Tailgating Information (Government of South Australia)
TRAFFIC AND CRIMES AMENDMENT (MENACING AND PREDATORY DRIVING) BILL  (New South Wales parliament Hansard transcript where tailgating is noted as being an offense under the new legislation).
Tailgating Information (Wisconsin Department of Transportation)
"Two Dots to Safety" campaign (operating in the United Kingdom and Europe, but also in Pennsylvania, Minnesota, Maryland, and Washington state)
 Police Force safety advice (Singapore)
Report on an anti-tailgating operation (by the Hong Kong police)

Hazardous motor vehicle activities